Walter Marshall Browne (16 September 1885 – 6 February 1959) was Archdeacon of Rochester from 1932 to 1951.

Life

He was born 16 September 1885, the son of Thomas Gillespie Chapman Browne, actuary, and Ann Mary Ballantyne.

He was educated at Tonbridge School, and admitted pensioner of Christ's College, Cambridge on 15 January 1904. He was ordained a deacon in 1909 and a priest in Southwell Minster in 1910.

He married Marjorie Vickers on 23 April 1914 at St. Ann's Church, Nottingham.

Appointments

He was appointed:
Curate of St. Ann's Church, Nottingham 1909  - 1912
Chaplain to the Bishop of Hereford 1912 - 1916
Vicar of St. Mary's Church, Attenborough 1916 - 1923
Vicar of Erith 1923 - 1932
Archdeacon of Rochester 1932 - 1951

Notes

1855 births
1959 deaths
People educated at Tonbridge School
Alumni of Christ's College, Cambridge
Archdeacons of Rochester